André Sousa may refer to:

 André Sousa (footballer, born 1990), Portuguese football midfielder
 André Sousa (footballer, born 1997), Portuguese football midfielder
 André Sousa (footballer, born 1998), Portuguese football midfielder
 André Sousa (futsal player) (born 1986), Portuguese futsal player